Clint Kriewaldt (born March 16, 1976) is a former American football linebacker. He was drafted by the Detroit Lions in the sixth round of the 1999 NFL Draft. He played college football at Wisconsin–Stevens Point.

Professional career
His first four seasons in the NFL were spent with the Detroit Lions, where he spent most of his time as a backup and on special teams. He played for the Pittsburgh Steelers from 2003–2007.

He made the opening tackle in Super Bowl XL against the Seattle Seahawks. On February 22, 2008 the Steelers released him; Kriewaldt's career was reportedly in jeopardy due to an injury.

In the media
Kriewaldt became a bit of a folk hero in his rookie season among listeners of WDFN in Detroit, despite (or likely due to) his third-string status. The staff recorded a parody of the Christmas standard "We Wish You a Merry Christmas", which went:

"We wish you a merry Kriewaldt, We wish you a merry Kriewaldt, We wish you a merry Kriewaldt..."

followed by Kriewaldt himself singing the line:

"And I hope that I play."

Personal life
Kriewaldt was an All-State running back at Shiocton High School, earned All-Region and All-Conference honors as running back and linebacker as a prep senior in 1993, was the 1993 Offensive Player of the Year in Central Wisconsin Conference (large schools), earned Team MVP and team captain in 1993, and set school rushing records for most career yards (3,357), single-season yards (1,552) and single-game yards (317). He earned his college degree in 2000 offseason. Kriewaldt is married. He served as the head coach for Freedom High School football team in Freedom, Wisconsin where he lives from 2012 to 2016, He served as an assistant in the program from 2016-2020 and recently became the head coach again in 2021.

Kriewaldt ran for Outagamie County sheriff in the Primary election on August 14, 2018.  His win was a landslide compared to the opposition.  His opponents included Co-worker Deputy John Brylski, former Marine, and Alex Bebris.

References

External links 
Pittsburgh Steelers bio

1976 births
Living people
People from Bovina, Wisconsin
American football linebackers
Detroit Lions players
Pittsburgh Steelers players
Wisconsin–Stevens Point Pointers football players
Players of American football from Wisconsin
People from Freedom, Outagamie County, Wisconsin